Piprahwa is a village near Siddharthnagar city in Siddharthnagar district of the Indian state of Uttar Pradesh. Kalanamak rice, a scented and spicy variety of rice is grown in this area. It lies in the heart of the historical Buddha's homeland and is 12 miles from the world heritage site of Lumbini that is believed to be the place of Gautama Buddha's birth.

Piprahwa is best known for its archaeological site and excavations that suggest that it may have been the burial place of the portion of the Buddha's ashes that were given to his own Shakya clan. A large stupa and the ruins of several monasteries as well as a museum are located within the site.  Ancient residential complexes and shrines were uncovered at the adjacent mound of Ganwaria.

Excavation by William Claxton Peppe
A buried stupa was discovered by William Claxton Peppe, a British colonial engineer and landowner of an estate at Piprahwa in January 1898. Following the severe famine that decimated Northern India in 1897, Peppe led a team in excavating a large earthen mound on his land. Having cleared away scrub and jungle, they set to work building a deep trench through the mound. After digging through 18 feet of solid brickwork, they came to a large stone coffer which contained five small vases containing bone fragments, ashes, and jewels. On one of the vases was a Brahmi script which was translated by Georg Bühler, a leading European epigraphist of the time, to mean:

<blockquote>
Sukiti-bhatinaṃ sabhaginikanam sa-puta-dalanam iyaṃ salila-nidhane Budhasa bhagavate sakiyanam
"This relic-shrine of divine Buddha (is the donation) of the Sakya-Sukiti brothers, associated with their sisters, sons, and wives, </blockquote>

This inscription implied that the bone fragments were part of the remains of Gautama Buddha, the founder of Buddhism. Throughout the following decade or so, epigraphists debated the precise meaning of the inscription. Vincent Smith, William Hoey, Thomas Rhys Davids, and Emile Senart all translated the inscription to confirm that these were relics of the Buddha.

In 1905, John Fleet, a former epigraphist of the Government of India, published a translation that agreed with this interpretation. However, on assuming the role of Secretary of the Royal Asiatic Society from Thomas Rhys Davids, Fleet proposed a different reading:

"This is a deposit of relics of the brethen of Sukiti, kinsmen of Buddha the Blessed One, with their sisters, their children and wives."

This interpretation was firmly rejected by his contemporaries. Following such criticism Fleet wrote: "I now abandon my opinion". Epigraphists of the time subscribed instead to the translation by Auguste Barth:

"This receptacle of relics of the blessed Buddha of the Śākyas (is the pious gift) of the brothers of Sukīrti, jointly with their sisters, with their sons and their wives."

Over a hundred years later, in the 2013 documentary, Bones of the Buddha, epigraphist Harry Falk of Freie Universität Berlin confirmed the original interpretation that the depositors believed these to be the remains of the Buddha himself. Falk translated the inscription as "these are the relics of the Buddha, the Lord" and concluded that the reliquary found at Piprahwa did contain a portion of the ashes of the Buddha and that the inscription is authentic.

In 1997, epigraphist and archaeologist Ahmad Hasan Dani noted the challenges that isolated finds present to paleographical study and to dating materials.  He concluded that "the inscription may be confidently dated to the earlier half of the second century B.C." but noted that "the Piprahwa vase, found in the Basti District, U.P. (Uttar Pradesh), has an inscription scratched on the steatite stone in a careless manner. As the inscription refers to the remains of the Buddha, it was originally dated to the pre-Mauryan period, but it has been brought down to the third century B.C. on a comparison with Asokan Brahmi. The style of writing is very poor, and there is nothing in it that speaks of the hand of the Asokan scribes".   Dani's dating of the inscription puts it around 250 years after the generally agreed 480 BCE death of the historical Buddha which suggests that the stupa itself was built after the Buddha's lifetime. The time difference is most likely explained by the Emperor Ashoka’s sudden conversion to Buddhism. After slaughtering tens of thousands to secure his kingdom, Ashoka issued a decree to build stupas and redistribute the Buddha’s remains across his kingdom.

Although there was some initial uncertainty about the translation, there is no record of any challenge to the authenticity of the find at the time. However, in introducing the discovery to the members of the Royal Asiatic Society in April 1900, its secretary, Thomas Rhys Davids, stressed that 'the hypothesis of forgery in this case is simply unthinkable'.  Over a century later some have assumed that such doubts must have therefore existed most likely because government archaeologist, A.A. Führer, had been working in the region and had recently been exposed for plagiarism and forgery.  The possibility of forgery was explored by writer and historian Charles Allen in his book The Buddha and Dr. Fuhrer and in his documentary Bones of the Buddha. He researches the unfolding of events at Piprahwa based on the letters of W.C. Péppe, Vincent Smith, and A.A. Führer, and concludes that Führer was unable to interfere with the discovery of the inscription made by W.C. Péppe. Harry Falk, professor of Indology at the Freie Universität in Berlin, stated in the documentary that Führer could not have forged the Piprahwa reliquary inscription. Richard Salomon of the University of Washington notes that 'Forgeries tend to be either blatant imitations of genuine inscriptions, or totally aberrant texts, and if the Piprahwa inscription were a forgery - which I am certain is not the case - it would belong to the latter category.' He goes on 'the Piprahwa inscription rings true in all regards'.

The main stupa at Piprahwa, one of the earliest so far discovered in India, was built in three phases. In the 6th-5th century BCE, around the time of the death of the Buddha, it was raised by piling up natural earth from the surrounding area. This was in accordance with a request of the Buddha who had asked that he be buried under the earth "heaped up as rice is heaped in an alms bowl." Phase II occurred during Ashoka’s rule (and was likely completed after his death around 235 BCE) as part of the Emperor’s mission to "distribute the relics of the exalted one." Ashoka opened up the original stupas containing the relics of the Buddha, then restored the stupa and interred a portion of what he had taken. The remaining relics were distributed to other new stupas. At Piprahwa, the restoration consisted of filling thick clay over the structure and of building two tiers to reach a height of 4.55m. The largest structure after the stupa is the Eastern Monastery that measures 45.11m x 41.14m with a courtyard and more than thirty cells around it. The complex includes an additional Southern Monastery, Western Monastery, and Northern Monastery.

Distribution of the relics

Prince Prisdang (aka Jinavaravansa), a former ambassador to Siam and cousin to the King Rama V, had been ordained as a Buddhist monk in Sri Lanka and arrived at Piprahwa shortly after the discovery. He soon learned that W.C. Peppe had placed his finds at the disposal of the government. His eloquent arguments to persuade British government officials to donate the bone relics to the King of Siam to share with Buddhist communities in other countries received some support from lower level British officials and worked their way up to the Viceroy. It was an obvious solution that might appease Buddhists who were upset that the recently discovered Bodh Gaya, believed to be the place of the Buddha's enlightenment, had remained under Hindu control. It was also a gesture of goodwill to a country that was being courted by the French, Russian, and Dutch superpowers of the time.  In 1899, a ceremony was held and the bone relics were handed off to an emissary of King Rama V and traveled to Bangkok. Prisdang’s request to be involved was not realized.

The bone relics were immediately distributed across several locations, including Golden Mount Temple in Bangkok, Thailand, Shwedagon pagoda in Rangoon, Myanmar, Arakan pagoda in Mandalay, Myanmar, Dipaduttamarama Temple in Colombo, Sri Lanka, Waskaduwe Vihara in Kalutara, Sri Lanka, and the Marichiwatta stupa'' in Anuradhapura, Sri Lanka.

The majority of the gold and jewelry relic offerings were donated by the Indian government to the Indian Museum, Kolkata. Today, a replica urn is on display. Photographs of the items are on display at the Kapilavastu Museum at Piprahwa that is visited by Buddhist pilgrims.

W. C. Peppe was allowed to retain a number of duplicates which are exhibited in museums today. He also gave some pieces to Prince Prisdang and Prisdang's Buddhist master, Sri Subuthi. A box of 12 flowers was most likely given to Thomas Rhys Davids and the Royal Archaeological Society and discovered as part of a clean up at the Buddhist Society headquarters in London in 2004.

On 16 December 2554 ( 2011), a portion of these Kapilvatthu Buddha Relics was offered to the Sangha of Ratanawan Monastery. In January, 2012, some of these relics were enshrined in the Buddha Homage Reliquary Hall, Ratanawan Monastery, Thailand.

Many senior monks participated in this auspicious ceremony including Ajahn Sumedho and Ajahn Viradhammo.

Excavations by the Archaeological Survey of India

From 1971-1973, a team of the Archaeological Survey of India led by K.M. Srivastava resumed excavations at the Piprahwa stupa site. The team discovered a casket containing fragments of charred bone, at a location several feet deeper than the coffer that W.C. Peppe had previously excavated. As the relic containers were found in the deposits from the period of Northern Black Polished Ware, Srivastava dated the find to the fifth-fourth centuries BCE, which would be consistent with the period in which the Buddha is believed to have lived.  He also discovered 13 sealings which bore the same legend in Kushan script: 'Of the community of the monks of great Kapilavastu'.  Today, the ancient sites of Piprahwa and Ganwaria host the Kapilavastu Museum, controlled by the Archaeological Survey of India.

The bone fragments recovered by Srivastava's team are currently located at the National Museum, New Delhi. In 1978, the Indian government allowed their share of the discovery to be exhibited in Sri Lanka and more than 10 million people paid homage. They were also exhibited in Mongolia in 1993, Singapore in 1994, South Korea in 1995, Thailand in 1996, and again in Sri Lanka in 2012.

Location of ancient Kapilavastu
Srivastava's discovery of the terracotta sealings bearing the name Kapilavastu has led some scholars to believe that modern-day Piprahwa was the site of the ancient city of Kapilavastu, the capital of the Shakya kingdom, where Siddhartha Gautama spent the first 29 years of his life.
This question is especially important to scholars of Buddhist history, as Kapilavastu was the capital of the Shakya kingdom. King Śuddhodana and Queen Māyādevī lived at Kapilavastu, as did their son Prince Siddhartha Gautama until he left the palace at 29 years of age.

See also

Bhattiprolu
Bimaran casket
Relics associated with Buddha
Sanchi

Notes

References

Sources

 
 
 
 
 
 
 
 
 Smith, V. A. (Oct., 1898), The Piprāhwā Stūpa, Journal of the Royal Asiatic Society of Great Britain and Ireland, p. 868

External links
 Piprahwa Museum
 ASI

Villages in Siddharthnagar district
Buddhist sites in Uttar Pradesh
Buddhist archaeological sites
Buddhist pilgrimage sites in India